Beijing Commune is a China-based gallery, mainly featuring emerging artists' exhibitions.

Commercial Gallery
Beijing Commune, located in the southern side of 798 Art Zone, was developed in 2004 by Leng Lin. It's a professional art gallery which exhibits and promotes Chinese contemporary art. It includes two exhibition halls, 17.5m x 9.5m and 10.95m x 7.06m large respectively.

An active art space, Beijing Commune has showcased miscellaneous artworks of both established and emerging Chinese artists, inclusive of painting, sculpture, video and photography, in an attempt to introduce the significant values of Chinese contemporary art to the world by means of regular shows and publishing catalogues.

Since its very beginning, Beijing Commune has received massive attentions in both domestic and international art scenes. Song Dong, as one of the established artists, was invited to hold a solo project at MoMA, New York City in 2009. Yin Xiuzhen, whose first exhibition‘Collective Subconscious’kicked off in 2007, were the second Chinese artists to be included in MoMA's ‘Projects’in 2010.

In recent years, the gallery focuses upon discovering potential artists of the younger generation. In 2010, video works of Ma Qiusha (b. 1982) and Zhao Yao (b. 1981) were shown at Tate Modern for "No Soul for Sale" festival, while Liang Yuanwei was one of the representative artists to join in the China Pavilion of the 54th Venice Biennale in 2011.Moreover, Hu Xiaoyuan (b. 1977) took part in group exhibition "THE UNGOVERNABLES-2012” of New Museum in 2012

Exhibitions
2014
GATE-OPENER
Song Ta: The Loveliest Guy
Xie Molin: Light/Deposits
Ma Qiusha: Works on Paper
N12-No.5
2013
Shang Yixin
Qiu Xiaofei: Rauschenberg Said, "the Walking Stick is Longer than the Maulstcik, after All."
Ma Qiusha: Raw
Liang Yuanwei: Pomegranate
2012
Hu Xiaoyuan
Shi Jing-hua
Zhao Yao (only Chinese)
Huang Yuxing
Ma Qiusha-STATIC ELECTRICITY
2011
Hong Hao-AS IT IS 
Yuan Yuan-NEW WORKS
Zhao Yao-I am Your Night
Wang Guangle
Constructing Form
2010
Liang Yuanwei-Golden Notes
Hu Xiaoyuan
Xiao Yu-TURN AROUND
SEVEN YOUNG ARTISTS
2009
Ma Qiusha
TOFU, KUNGFU, POLIT-SHEER-FORM
HONG HAO-BOTTOM
Wang Guangle
Liu Jianhua-HORIZON
2008
Li Yousong
LIBRARY
Liu Lan COLLECTION
Liu Jianhua
North of Taiping Mountain is All Grassland
Landscape
2007
YIN XIUZHEN IN BEIJING COMMUNE
POLIT-SHEER-FORM
LOOKING FOR ART
SONG DONG IN BEIJING COMMUNE
THE STORY IS OVER
2006
PROPERTY OF L.W
Moving in the margins between history and society, Zhao Bandi creates a new, hitherto latent subject of social action. What does this mean?
LOOKING FOR TERRORISTS
HOME
NEWS
2005
SUBLIMATION-A New Art Project by Zhang Dali
ONLY ONE WALL
MAYFLY
THE GAME OF REALISM

Artists currently represented
Hu Xiaoyuan
Liang Shuo
Liang Yuanwei
Lu Yang
Ma Qiusha
Qiu Xiaofei
Shang Yixin
Song Ta
Wang Guangle
Xie Molin
Yu Ji
Zhao Yao
Zhang Xiaogang

External links
 http://www.beijingcommune.com/CnIndex.aspx

Art museums and galleries in China